Hunter Point is a point in the U.S. state of Washington.

Hunter Point was named after Alfred Allen Hunter, an early settler.

References

Landforms of Thurston County, Washington
Headlands of Washington (state)